McAlevys Fort is an unincorporated community located in Jackson Township in Huntingdon County, Pennsylvania, United States.  The community is located along Pennsylvania Route 26, north of the overlap with Pennsylvania Route 305.

The community was named after a pioneer fort which was built near the present town site in 1778 by Captain William McAlevy.

References

Unincorporated communities in Huntingdon County, Pennsylvania
Unincorporated communities in Pennsylvania